Bradford is a hamlet in the county of Cornwall, England, UK, 10.3 km north-northeast of the town of Bodmin, north of the A30 road. Bradford is in the valley of the De Lank River on Bodmin Moor. According to the Post Office the 2011 census population was included in the civil parish of Blisland.

References 

Philip's Navigator Britain (page 17)

Hamlets in Cornwall